Mohsen Yeganeh (born May 13, 1985) is an Iranian singer and musician. He performed at many concerts including one at the Fajr International Music Festival.

Early life 

Mohsen Yeganeh was born in Gonbad-e Kavus to Persian parents, Mohammad Reza Yeganeh, who died in the Iran–Iraq War and a mother who works as a university professor. He has two older sisters and a younger brother. He lives in Tehran with his daughter and wife.

Discography

See also
 Persian pop music

References

External links

 
 
 
 Mohsen Yeganeh on Spotify

1985 births
Living people
Iranian composers
Iranian songwriters
Iranian pop singers
Iranian male singers
Iranian pop musicians
Iranian music arrangers
Persian-language singers
Iranian record producers
Iranian singer-songwriters
People from Gonbad-e Qabus